This article contains comprehensive discography information related to Joe Tex.

Albums

1965 Hold What You've Got (Dial Records, distributed by Atlantic Records) - US Pop #124, US R&B #2
1965  Hold On! It's Joe Tex (Checker)
1965  The Best of Joe Tex (King)
1965  The Best of Joe Tex (Parrot)
1965  Joe Tex (Pickwick)
1965  The New Boss (Dial/Atlantic) - US #142, US R&B #3
1966  The Love You Save (Dial/Atlantic) - US #108
1966  I've Got to Do a Little Better (Dial/Atlantic)
1967  The Best of Joe Tex (Dial/Atlantic)
1968  Live and Lively (Dial/Atlantic) - US #84
1968  Soul Country (Dial/Atlantic) - US #154
1969  Happy Soul (Dial/Atlantic)
1969  Buying a Book (Dial/Atlantic) - US #190
1969  You Better Get It (Dial/Atlantic)
1970  With Strings and Things (Dial/Atlantic)
1972  From the Roots Came the Rapper (Dial/Atlantic)
1972  I Gotcha (Dial) - US #17
1972  The History of...Joe Tex (Pride)
1972  Spill the Beans (Dial)
1973  The Best of Joe Tex (Citation)
1977  Bumps & Bruises (Epic) - US #108
1977  Another Woman's Man (Power Pak)
1978  Rub Down (Epic)
1979  He Who Is Without Funk Cast the First Stone (Dial)
1979  Super Soul (Parrot/London)
1982  J.T.'s Funk (Accord)
1984  Ain't I a Mess (Chess)
1985  The Best of Joe Tex (Atlantic)
1988  I Believe I'm Gonna Make It:  The Best of Joe Tex 1964-1972 (Rhino)
1988  The Best of Joe Tex (Charly)
1989  Different Strokes (Charly)
1989  Stone Soul Country (Charly)
1991  Greatest Hits (Curb)
1999 His Greatest Hits (Charly)
2000 25 All Time Greatest Hits (Varèse)
2000 Golden Legends (Direct Source)
2000 Greatest Hits!!!  (7-N/Buddha)
2001 Show Me the Hits (Malaco)
2001 Oh Boy Classics Presents Joe Tex (Oh Boy)
2001 Hold On to What You've Got/The New Boss (Connoisseur Collection)
2001 The Love You Save/I've Got to Do a Little Bit Better (Connoisseur Collection)
2002 Buying a Book (includes bonus tracks)
2002 The Masters (Eagle Rock Entertainment)
2002 12 Hits: Five Star Collection (Varese)
2002 Ain't Gonna Bump No More (Southbound)
2002 David Allan Coe Presents Joe Tex (Coe Pop)
2002 The Complete Dial Recordings, Volume 3: Live and Lively/Soul Country (RPM)
2002 The Complete Dial Recordings, Volume 4:  Happy Soul/Buying a Book (RPM)
2002 Testifyin': The Essential Joe Tex (Castle Select)
2003  Classic Masters (Capitol)
2004  This Is Gold (Disky)
2006  The Very Best of, Volume 1 (Sony)
2006  The Very Best of, Volume 2 (Sony)
2006  Yum Yum Yum (HHO Licensing)
2006  The Best of Joe Tex (Platinum Disc)
2006  Golden Soul Hits (CBujEnt.)
2006  Nothing But a Joe Tex Party (Legacy)
2007  The One That You Love (KRB Music)
2007  Greatest Hits (Collectables)
2007  Greatest Hits (Neon)
2008  The Best of Joe Tex (Gusto)
2008  The Love You Save (Roots and Rhythm)
2008  First on the Dial:  Early Singles and Rare Gems (Shout)
2008  Get Way Back: The 1950s Recordings (Ace)

Singles

Soundtrack Inclusions (Joe Tex performances)

 
1970  The Boys in the Band ("Take the Fifth Amendment")
1992  Reservoir Dogs ("I Gotcha")
1993  Love Is Like That ("The Love You Save (May Be Your Own)")
1995  Go Now ("Show Me", "Woman Like That Yeah", "I'm a Man", "I Want To (Do Everything for You)", "A Sweet Woman Like You", "I'll Never Do You Wrong")
1995  Sabrina ("Love's in Need of Love Today")
1996  I Shot Andy Warhol ("Ain't Gonna Bump No More with No Big Fat Woman")
1999  Edtv ("Have You Ever")
2000  The Visit ("You Said a Bad Word")
2000  Jesus' Son ("The Love You Save (May Be Your Own)")
2002  Serving Sara ("I Gotcha")
2004: When Will I Be Loved ("Hold On to What You've Got")
2004  Mr. 3000 ("I Gotcha")
2007  Music Within ("Papa Was, Too")
2007  Death Proof ("The Love You Save (May Be Your Own)")
2007  Grindhouse ("The Love You Save (May Be Your Own)")
2008  The Wire (1 episode, "Just Out of Reach")
2018  Ash vs Evil Dead (1 episode, "You Said a Bad Word")

References 

Discographies of American artists
Hip hop discographies
Rhythm and blues discographies